This list of museums in Louisiana is a list of museums, defined for this context as institutions (including nonprofit organizations, government entities, and private businesses) that collect and care for objects of cultural, artistic, scientific, or historical interest and make their collections or related exhibits available for public viewing. Museums that exist only in cyberspace (i.e., virtual museums) are not included. Also included are non-profit and university art galleries.

Museums

Defunct museums
 Ark-La-Tex Antique and Classic Vehicle Museum, Shreveport
 Arna Bontemps African American Museum, Alexandria 
 Barnwell Garden & Art Center, Shreveport, closed in 2012
 Fort Pike State Historic Site, New Orleans, closed indefinitely due to damage from Hurricane Katrina
 Historic Donaldsonville Museum, Donaldsonville
 New Orleans Jazz Museum, collections now part of the Louisiana State Museum
 Old Courthouse Museum, Natchitoches 
 Opelousas Museum of Art
 Pentagon Barracks Museum, Baton Rouge 
 Port Allen Railroad Depot, Port Allen
 Robert Gentry Museum, Many
 Shreveport Firefighter's Museum, Shreveport

See also
 Arboreta in Louisiana (category)
 Aquaria in Louisiana (category)
 Botanical gardens in Louisiana (category)
 Historic landmarks in Louisiana
 Houses in Louisiana (category)
 Forts in Louisiana (category)
 Museums list
 Nature Centers in Louisiana
 Observatories in Louisiana (category)
 Registered Historic Places in Louisiana

References

Resources
Louisiana Association of Museums

Louisiana
Museums
Museums